Ribeira Brava is a municipality on the island of Madeira, in the Portuguese Autonomous Region of Madeira. It is located along the southern coast (approximately centre), and is west of Câmara de Lobos and the regional capital Funchal, south of São Vicente, and east of Ponta do Sol. The population in 2011 was 13,375, in an area of 65.41 km2.

The municipality gained its name due to its river, which translates as "angry river". In rainy seasons, the river had an extremely strong and powerful current, that often wreaked havoc over the entire eight kilometres of the route.

Geography
The municipality's namesake, the Ribeira Brava ravine and river valley extends from the slopes of the west-central mountains
of Madeira. Its waters provide the primary sources of drinking-water (a small reservoir collects surface run-off) to the area and
electricity to the island of Madeira. Approximately ten tributaries feed this river, whose course ends in the Serra de Água and
which much later empties into the Atlantic along the village's coast.

The primary urban agglomerations are the five civil parishes, constituted with their own local government. They include:

 Campanário
 Ribeira Brava
 Serra de Água
 Tabua

Buildings and structures
The Centro Desportivo da Madeira stadium is located in the municipality.

Notable people 
 Nadia Almada (born 1977 in Ribeira Brava) a transgender British TV personality; won the fifth series of Big Brother.
 Marquinho (born 1989 in Ribeira Brava) a footballer with over 250 club caps

Gallery

References

Towns in Portugal
Madeira Island
Municipalities of Madeira
People from Ribeira Brava, Madeira